Imtiaz Dharker (born 31 January 1954) is a Pakistan-born British poet, artist, and video film maker. She won the Queen's Gold Medal for her English poetry and was appointed Chancellor of Newcastle University from January 2020.

In 2019, she was considered for the position of Poet Laureate following the tenure of Dame Carol Ann Duffy, but withdrew herself from contention in order, as she stated, to maintain focus on her writing."I had to weigh the privacy I need to write poems against the demands of a public role. The poems won," said Dharker. For many Dharker is seen as one of Britain's most inspirational contemporary poets. She was elected a Fellow of the Royal Society of Literature in 2011. In the same year, she received the Cholmondeley Award from the Society of Authors. In 2016, she received an Honorary Doctorate from SOAS University of London.

Dharker was born in Lahore, Punjab, Pakistan. She grew up in Glasgow where her family moved when she was less than one year old. She was married to Simon Powell, the founder of the organisation Poetry Live, who died in October 2009 after an 11 year battle with cancer. 

With Poetry Live, she reads to over 25,000 students a year, travelling across the country with poets including Duffy, Simon Armitage, John Agard, Gillian Clarke, Daljit Nagra, Grace Nichols, Owen Sheers, Jackie Kay and Maura Dooley. Dharker divides her time between London, Wales, and Mumbai. She says she describes herself as a "Scottish Muslim Calvinist" adopted by India and married into Wales.  Her daughter, Ayesha (whose father is Anil Dharker), is an actress in international films, television and stage.

Dharker is a prescribed poet on the British AQA GCSE English syllabus. Her poems Blessing, This Room and The right word were included in the AQA Anthology Different Cultures, Cluster 1 and 2 respectively. Her poem Tissue appears in the 2017 AQA poetry anthology for GCSE English Literature. Her poems Living Space and In Wales, wanting to be Italian also appear in the Eduqas WJEC poetry anthology for GCSE English Literature.

Dharker was a member of the judging panel for the 2008 Manchester Poetry Prize, with Gillian Clarke and Dame Carol Ann Duffy. In 2011, she judged the Foyle Young Poets of the Year Award with the poet Glyn Maxwell. In 2012 she was nominated a Parnassus Poet at the Festival of the World, hosted by the Southbank Centre as part of the Cultural Olympiad 2012, the largest poetry festival ever staged in the UK, bringing together poets from all the competing Olympic nations. 

She was the poet in residence at the Cambridge University Library from January–March 2013. In July 2015, she appeared on the popular BBC Radio 4 programme Desert Island Discs and spoke about growing up in Glasgow and her decision to leave her family and elope to India, as well as her marriage to Powell.

Themes 
The main themes of  Dharker's poetry include home, freedom, journeys, geographical and cultural displacement, communal conflict and gender politics. All her books are published by  Bloodaxe Books.

Film 

Dharker is also a video film maker and has written and directed more than a hundred films and audio-visuals, centering on education, reproductive health and shelter for women and children. In 1980 she was awarded a Silver Lotus for a short film.

Art 

An accomplished artist, she has had 11 solo exhibitions of pen-and-ink drawings in India, Hong Kong, USA, UK, and France. All her poetry collections contain her drawings. She was one of the poet/artists featured in the Poet Slash Artist exhibition curated by poet Lemn Sissay and the art guru Hans Ulrich Obrist for Manchester International Festival 2021, along with Tracy Emin, Lubaina Himid, Precious Okoyomon, Inua Ellams, Jay Bernard, Adonis, Etel Adnan, Anne Boyer, Jimmie Durham,  Ibrahim El-Salahi, Renee Gladman, Sky Hopinka, Friederike Mayröcker, Xu Bing, and Gozo Yoshimasu.

"In classical Chinese, Arabic and Persian poetry, calligraphy connects the verbal and visual in ways that make poetry and art practically the same thing. That way of seeing words is remade for today by Imtiaz Dharker in her captivating drawing My Breath. Stripes flow magically out of her body into space. The lines continue their journey through a second picture, then in the third become words, lines of poetry repeated, repeated, repeated through entire blocks of text. It is a perfect illustration of the subtle and mysterious relationship between writing and drawing, seeing and reading. Poet Slash Artist, curated by the poet Lemn Sissay and the art guru Hans Ulrich Obrist, probes the mystery of that borderland, and finds what can only be called spirituality. The soul, even... This exhibition is a manifesto for a new culture, where the hubbub and hype are silenced, and at last we can hear one another think."

Publications
Purdah (Oxford University Press, India, 1989)
Postcards from God (including Purdah) (Bloodaxe Books, 1997)
I Speak for the Devil (Bloodaxe Books, 2001, ; Penguin Books India, 2003)
The Terrorist at my Table (Bloodaxe Books, 2006, ; Penguin Books India 2007)
Leaving Fingerprints (Bloodaxe Books, 2009. )
Over the Moon (Bloodaxe Books, 2014. )
Luck is the Hook (Bloodaxe Books, 2018. )

References

External links
Official website

Fellows of the Royal Society of Literature
Pakistani emigrants to the United Kingdom
Naturalised citizens of the United Kingdom
Writers from Glasgow
British women poets
Living people
Pakistani documentary filmmakers
English-language poets from Pakistan
British expatriates in India
British Muslims
Artists from Glasgow
Women documentary filmmakers
People associated with Newcastle University
1954 births
Scottish poets